Metro Toronto Roads and Traffic (later Metro Transportation) was a department within the former  Municipality of  Metropolitan Toronto.

The department was responsible for maintaining major arterial roads, bridges and local freeways systems (Gardiner Expressway, Don Valley Parkway and W.R. Allen Road) in Metropolitan Toronto and all traffic signal-controlled intersections. Metro roads were akin to county roads, but were not signposted with numbers.

The department did have influence over the design of the city.  One example is the width of Yonge Street.  When the Toronto Eaton Centre was built, it was setback from the street as to allow the possibility of a future lane of traffic.  It wasn't until the late 1990s that the mall was allowed to expand out towards Yonge.

Metro Toronto Roads and Traffic bronze plaques are found on bridges throughout Toronto, but some are being replaced with City of Toronto signs as they are refurbished by Toronto Transportation.

Metro Roads
Most major roads in Toronto were under the authority of Metro Roads and Traffic and a few expressways:

 Gardiner Expressway
 W.R. Allen Road
 Don Valley Parkway

Streets:

Yonge Street within Metro Toronto
Kipling Avenue within Metro Toronto
Islington Avenue within Metro Toronto
Royal York Road
Jane Street within Metro Toronto
Keele Street within Metro Toronto
Weston Road within Metro Toronto
Parkside Drive
Dufferin Street within Metro Toronto
Bathurst Street within Metro Toronto
Spadina Road, Spadina Avenue and Spadina Crescent
Avenue Road
York Street
University Avenue
Jarvis Street
Mount Pleasant Road
Bayview Avenue within Metro Toronto
Leslie Street within Metro Toronto
Don Mills Road
Victoria Park Avenue
Warden Avenue within Metro Toronto
Kennedy Road within Metro Toronto
McCowan Road within Metro Toronto
Markham Road within Metro Toronto
Morningside Avenue
Steeles Avenue within Metro Toronto
Finch Avenue within Metro Toronto
Albion Road
Sheppard Avenue  within Metro Toronto 
Wilson Avenue
York Mills Road
Ellesmere Road
Lawrence Avenue
Eglinton Avenue  within Metro Toronto
Burnhamthorpe Road within Metro Toronto
St. Clair Avenue
Bloor Street within Metro Toronto
Dundas Street within Metro Toronto
Richmond Street
Adelaide Street
Lake Shore Boulevard
The Queensway

Other tasks assigned to Metro Roads:
 
 snow removal on Metro Toronto managed roads including use of 5 Trecan Metromelters
 road repair on Metro Toronto managed roads and bridges

Post amalgamation
The department merged with local departments in 1998 under the  Transportation Services Division, which now handles both major arterial and minor local roads across the city. Some vehicles bearing Metro Toronto Roads and Traffic symbols can still be found in the city, but they will disappear once they are retired or repainted.

Metropolitan Toronto